Lachezar Yordanov (born 31 May 2000) is a Bulgarian footballer who plays as a midfielder for Cherno More Varna.

Career

Cherno More
On 28 April 2018, Yordanov made his professional début in a 1–0 away loss against Vitosha Bistritsa, coming on as substitute for Fábinho. On 28 May 2019, he signed his first professional contract with the club.

Career statistics

References

External links

2000 births
Living people
Bulgarian footballers
Association football midfielders
First Professional Football League (Bulgaria) players
PFC Cherno More Varna players
FC Sozopol players
PFC Dobrudzha Dobrich players
Sportspeople from Varna, Bulgaria